The Jones, later Jones-Brydges Baronetcy, of Boultibrook in the County of Radnorshire, was a title in the Baronetage of the United Kingdom. It was created on 9 October 1807 for Harford Jones, Envoy Extraordinary and Minister Plenipotentiary to Persia from 1807 to 1811. He later assumed the additional surname of Brydges.  The title became extinct on the death of the second Baronet in 1891.

Jones, later Jones-Brydges baronets, of Boultibrook (1807)

Sir Harford Jones-Brydges, 1st Baronet (1764–1847)
Sir Harford James Jones-Brydges, 2nd Baronet (1808–1891)

References

Extinct baronetcies in the Baronetage of the United Kingdom